Ananiel, Anânêl (Aramaic: עננאל, Greek: Ανανιας) was the 14th Watcher of the 20 leaders of the 200 fallen angels who are mentioned in an ancient work titled the Book of Enoch. The name Ananiel is sometimes translated as "Rain of God" even though the name is often confused with the name Hananiel. Michael Knibb interprets his name to be "cloud of God".  The name came into Arabic from the Coptics who in turn transliterated it from the Greeks.

Ananiel was entrusted by God "all the trees of the earth, its plants, the rain, the dew, the heat, the simoom, the wind and as many [atmospheric phenomena] as there are in summer and winter."

Ananiel is also known as an angelic guard of the gates of the South Wind.  The Book of Enoch describes three gates for each direction.  The first gate inclines to the south-east and brings a hot wind.  The second is due south and brings pleasant fragrances, dew, rain, prosperity and life.  The third is south-west and brings dew, rain, locusts and devastation.  Ananiel is one of the guardians of these gates and can be interpreted as an Archangel to petition for these.

Conversely, according to the tradition of the Coptic Orthodox Church, Ananiel is the name of one of the seven holy archangels.

See also
 List of angels in theology

References

Further reading 
Davidson, Gustav (1967). A Dictionary of Angels. The Free Press 
Membrives & Peinado (2012). Aspects of Literary Translation:  Building Linguistic and Cultural Bridge in Past and Present. Germany: Gunter Narr Verlag 
Knibb, Michael (1979). The Ethiopic Book Of Enoch. Oxford: Clarendon Press. 
(2009). The Book of Enoch.  IAP. 

Individual angels
Archangels
Watchers (angels)